The 1976 Copa Perú season, the promotion tournament of Peruvian football.

In this tournament after many qualification rounds, each one of the 24 departments in which Peru is politically divided, qualify a team. Those teams plus de team relegated from First Division on the last year, enter in two more rounds and finally 6 of them qualify for the Final round, staged in Lima (the capital).

The champion was promoted to 1977 Torneo Descentralizado.

Finalists teams
The following list shows the teams that qualified for the Final Stage.

Final stage

Final group stage

Round 1

Round 2

Round 3

Round 4

Round 5

External links
  Copa Peru 1976
  Semanario Pasión

Copa Perú seasons
Cop